The 1929–30 season First Division match between Leicester City and Arsenal at Filbert Street took place on 21 April 1930. The game finished as a 6–6 draw, the highest scoring draw in the history of first class English football. The record still stands today though was matched in a Second Division fixture between Charlton Athletic and Middlesbrough in October 1960.

Details

Summary
The game took place five days before Arsenal's FA Cup final against Huddersfield Town and the club rested a number of players. Arsenal's David Halliday scored four goals as Arsenal came back from a half-time scoreline of 3–1 to draw the game 6–6 The Gunners also had a goal disallowed.

Aftermath
Arsenal played in the FA Cup final later in the same week. Despite his four goals Halliday was not selected for the game. Arsenal went on to lift the trophy, defeating Huddersfield Town 2–0. Halliday now had five goals from his last three Arsenal first team's games. However after the Leicester 6–6 draw he never played for Arsenal's first team again.

Halliday later became Leicester's manager.

References

1929–30 in English football
Leicester 1930
Arsenal 1930
Football League First Division matches
April 1930 sports events
20th century in Leicester